Final Noise E.P. is an EP of the band Eisley released March 21, 2006 on Reprise Records. Though the EP is labeled under Eisley, it also contains songs by artists Simon Dawes and Timmy Curran.

Track listing

Eisley albums
2006 EPs